Latif Lahlou (born 3 April 1939 in El Jadida) is a Moroccan filmmaker.

Career 
After training in film at IDHEC in 1959, Lahlou studied sociology at the Sorbonne. He edited multiple short films in the 1960s. He then joined the CCM (national film center), where he worked as an editor and producer for short films. He participated in the financing of Souheil Benbarka's La guerre du pétrole n'aura pas lieu. He has directed a number of feature films throughout the decades.

Filmography

Feature films (as director) 

 1969: Soleil de printemps
 1986: La compromission
 2007: Les jardins de Samira
 2010: La grande villa
 2014: L'anniversaire

Documentaries 

 1963: Cultivez la Betterave (as editor)
 1966: Fourrage (as writer)
 1967: Sin Agafaye (as writer)
 1968: De Cote de la Tassaout

External links

References 

1939 births
Living people
Moroccan film directors